Chris Joris (born 30 November 1952, Mechelen) is a Belgian jazz percussionist, pianist and composer.  He is the son of Jan Joris, an opera singer.  Joris joined Aksak Maboul in 1977, appeared on their first album but left the group later that year. In the mid 1990s, he formed The Chris Joris Experience, a jazz band with Sam Versweyveld (trumpet), Bart Defoort (saxophone), Ernst Vranckx (piano) and Chris Mentens (acoustic bass).  He won the 1998 Belgian Golden Django for best Flemish artist.

Recordings
In October 2007 Joris released Rainbow Country on the Belgium De Werf label. The CD features:  Bob Stewart: tuba, compo's
Eric Person: alto- et soprano sax, flute, compo's
Baba Sissoko: tama, tamani, ngoni, vocals, compo's
Fabian Fiorini: piano
Reggie Washington: electric bass, compo
Chris Mentens: double bass
Junior Mthombeni: congas, udu, percussion, voice
Chris Joris: timba, cymbals, djembé, congas, steeldrum, likembé, small percussion, compo's, leader

References
Jazz in Belgium biography
[ Chris Joris] at Allmusic

Belgian jazz pianists
Belgian jazz composers
Belgian male musicians
Male jazz composers
Living people
1952 births
21st-century pianists
21st-century male musicians